Dristernan is a small townland in County Leitrim, Ireland.

References

Townlands of County Leitrim